G. Kamalamma, (1930–2012) was a school teacher for most of her professional life, and was  an author, mostly in the spheres of language and literature, socio-cultural subjects and biography. She  wrote over 30 books, all in the Malayalam language, and won citations and awards from both the Sahitya Academy of India and the Sahitya Academy of Kerala.

Birth and early life

Kamalamma was born in 1930 in Perumbuzha village near Kundara in Kollam district, Kerala.  Her father Sahitya-shiromani M. K. Govindan (1901~1968) was a Sanskrit scholar, professor and writer; the son of Kunjan Channaar of Mundupoyikavila house in Perumbuzha.  Kamalamma's mother was Gowrikutty, the daughter of Kavila Perumal Govindan of Perinad, in Kollam.

Professional career

After graduating, as BA and BT, Kamalamma began her professional career as a Social Education Organizer in the Development Department of the Government of Kerala, where she worked for the first ten years. Following this, she took up job as a teacher, working for twenty four years before retiring from her academic career in 1987.

While working in her official capacities, Kamalamma began a parallel career as an author, focusing on areas of interest to her such as Malayalam language and literature, transliteration of Western literature into the Malayalam language, children's literature and biographical profiling.

Biographies
 Kasthuribai Gandhi – (A profile on the life of Mahatma Gandhi's wife Kasturba Gandhi) (In Malayalam & English) (Many Editions)
 Sarojini Naidu – (A profile on the life of Sarojini Naidu)
 Sree Narayana Guru Jeevithavum Darsanavum – (The life and vision of Sree Narayana Guru)
 N. Gopala Pillai – (A biographic profile of N. Gopala Pillai, a Sanskrit scholar, author and ex-Principal of the Government Sanskrit College, Thiruvananthapuram) Cultural Affairs Department, Government of Kerala

Translations
 Robinson Crusoe – (a translation of Daniel Defoe's novel Robinson Crusoe into the Malayalam language) SPCS, Poorna Publishers (Many Editions)
 Iliad (a translation of Homer's work into the Malayalam language) Kerala Sahitya Academy
 Iliad (Abridged) (a translation of Homer's work into the Malayalam language) SPCS, Poorna Publishers (Many Editions)
 Odyssey (a translation of Homer's work into the Malayalam language) SPCS, Poorna Publishers (Many Editions)

Studies
 Asan Sahithya Praveshika (Introduction to Asan's literature) SPCS
 Ulloor Sahithya Praveshika (Introduction to Ulloor's literature) DC Current Books
 Vallathol Sahithya Pravesika – (Collection of written material related to Vallathol Narayana Menon) Marar Sahitya Prakasham
 Ezhava Samudayathile Maharathanmaar – (Great leaders of the Ezhava community).
 Sree Narayanante Kshetra Sankalpam – (Sree Narayana's Concept of Temples)
 Malayala Bhashayude Adiverukal – (A study on the roots of Malayalam language) DC Current Books
 Malayala Bhashaye Dhanyamakkiya Christian Missionarimar (Contributions by Christian Missionaries to the Malayalam language) Carmel International Publishing House
 Karuna Natakavum Kathaprasangakalayum Attakkathayum Mattum (Some Visual-Narrative art forms of Kerala) Rainbow Book Publishers
 Nakshathrangalum Grahangalum: Alpam Varthamanam (Popular Astronomy)  Rainbow Book Publishers

Collections
 Akshara Sloka Ranjini – (Akshara Sloka Collection of Slokas) DC Current Books (Many Editions)
 Akshara Sloka Rathnavali – (Akshara Sloka gemstring) DC Current Books (Many Editions)
 Akshara Sloka Rasikaranjini –  (Akshara Sloka Collection of Slokas – Ekavrittam) Rainbow Book Publishers
 Pazhamayude Artha Thalangal (The Connotations of Heritage) DC Current Books (Many Editions)
 Thiruvathirappattukal (Collection of Thiruvathira songs) DC Current Books.
 Kavyamritam (Poetic excerpts) Rainbow Book Publishers
 Sreenarayanagurudeva Vachanamritam (Collection)

Poetry
 Ampilithoni (Poems) Saindhava Books
 G. Kamalammayude Kavithakal (Poems) Saindhava Books
 Sreenarayanagurudevasankeerthananam

Books for neoliterates
 Sree Narayana Guru  – Kerala Granthashalasangham
 Maharashtravum Gujarathum  – Kerala Granthashalasangham
 Tagore  – Kerala Granthashalasangham
 Arivulla Ammamar (Knowledgeable Mothers) – Kerala University (Adult Education)
 Agathikalude Amma  – KANFED

Children's literature
 Kuttikalude Kasthuribai Gandhi – (A profile on the life of Mahatma Gandhi's wife Kasturba Gandhi) – Kerala State Institute of Children's Literature
 Kuttikalude Mahatma Gandhi – Kerala State Institute of Children's Literature
 Kuttikalude Iliad (a translation of Homer's work into the Malayalam language) – Kerala State Institute of Children's Literature
 Nadunarunnu
 Punyateertham – (Holy Water) Publications Division, Government of India

Awards and citations

Kamalamma won the following awards and citations:

 Ulloor Smaraka Samithi's Ulloor Endowment Award  2011
 Government of Kerala's award for remarkable service as a teacher for the year 1985–86.
 Kerala Sahitya Academy award for children's literature for the year 1965.
 Government of India's award for authoring the best book on innovative literature for the year 1964.
 Government of India's award for authoring the best book on innovative literature for the year 1956.

References

1930 births
Novelists from Kerala
People from Kollam district
2012 deaths
Indian women translators
Indian women children's writers
Indian children's writers
20th-century Indian biographers
Indian women non-fiction writers
Women biographers
Malayalam-language writers
20th-century Indian women writers
20th-century Indian novelists
Indian women novelists
Women writers from Kerala
20th-century Indian translators